Sunspots is a Canadian travel television series which aired on CBC Television in 1974 and 1975.

Premise
This series featured information on various travel destinations such as Austria, Trinidad and Tobago, and domestic locations such as Île d'Orléans. Series footage was recorded on Super 8 mm film.

Scheduling
This half-hour series was broadcast over two years, first on Saturdays at 12:30 p.m. (Eastern time) from 13 July to 28 September 1974, then on Sundays at 10:30 a.m. from 16 March to 25 May 1975.

References

External links
 

CBC Television original programming
Canadian travel television series
1974 Canadian television series debuts
1975 Canadian television series endings